Same-sex marriage in Nebraska has been legally recognized since June 26, 2015, when the U.S. Supreme Court ruled in the case of Obergefell v. Hodges that the denial of marriage rights to same-sex couples violates the Fourteenth Amendment. Following the court ruling, the Attorney General, Doug Peterson, announced that the state of Nebraska would comply and recognize same-sex marriages.

Legal history
In November 2000, Nebraska voters adopted Initiative Measure 416, a constitutional amendment defining marriage as the union of a man and a woman and prohibiting the recognition of same-sex relationships under any other name. The measure passed with 70.10% in favour and 29.90% opposed. The state has only restricted marriage rights for same-sex couples in its state constitution; it has never passed a measure to that effect in the form of a statute passed in the Nebraska Legislature.

Nebraska extended hospital visitation rights to same-sex couples through a designated visitor statute.

Repeal of the same-sex marriage ban
In January 2016, decision began on whether the defunct same-sex marriage ban should be removed from the State Constitution. Senator Burke Harr argued that the Constitution should be consistent with the law of the land regarding same-sex marriage. Such a change would require approval by voters. Two religious organizations opposed the measure, claiming it was "too costly" and that it would "only create more divisiveness". Senator Patty Pansing Brooks later said, "Enough hurt. Enough harm. Enough damage has been done by the religious institutions." Senator Matt Hansen also introduced bills to make all references to marriage gender-neutral in state statutes, though the bills failed to pass.

In January 2021, Senator Pansing Brooks presented a ballot measure to repeal the state's defunct same-sex marriage ban. She argued that "putting the issue on the ballot would allow voters to show that public attitudes toward same-sex marriage have changed in Nebraska". The proposal was referred to the Judiciary Committee, which approved the measure on February 11 by a 5–2 vote, but it was not voted on before the State Legislature adjourned sine die on May 27, 2021. A similar measure was proposed in 2023 by Senator Jen Day.

Lawsuits

Citizens for Equal Protection v. Bruning

In 2003, two LGBT advocacy organizations, Citizens for Equal Protection and the Nebraska Advocates for Justice and Equality, joined by the American Civil Liberties Union (ACLU) and also represented by Lambda Legal, filed suit in the United States District Court for the District of Nebraska challenging the constitutionality of Initiative Measure 416. District Court Judge Joseph Bataillon ruled in favour of the plaintiffs on May 12, 2005, overturning Initiative Measure 416 based on the Equal Protection Clause, the First Amendment, and the prohibition on bills of attainder contained in the Contract Clause.

The state appealed the decision to the Eighth Circuit Court of Appeals and on July 14, 2006, in a unanimous opinion written by Chief Judge James B. Loken, the Eighth Court reversed the district court's decision on all three of its conclusions. The plaintiffs' subsequent request for an Eighth Circuit rehearing en banc was denied and they elected to not file a petition for certiorari in the U.S. Supreme Court.

Waters v. Ricketts
On November 17, 2014, the ACLU filed a lawsuit, originally Waters v. Heineman, in federal court on behalf of seven same-sex couples. The plaintiffs sought to overturn Nebraska's same-sex marriage ban and to have their out-of-state marriages recognized. The case became Waters v. Ricketts when Pete Ricketts succeeded Dave Heineman as governor in January 2015. On January 21, 2015, the state asked for proceedings to be stayed pending action by the U.S. Supreme Court in related same-sex marriage cases, and on January 23 Senior Judge Joseph Bataillon cancelled a hearing he had scheduled for January 29. On January 27, he denied the state's request to suspend proceedings. He held oral arguments on February 19. On March 2, he ruled for the plaintiffs, setting March 9 as the effective date of his order.

Attorney General Doug Peterson immediately announced the state would appeal the ruling and asked the Eighth Circuit Court of Appeals to stay Judge Bataillon's order prohibiting enforcement of the state's same-sex marriage ban. He requested a stay pending appeal the next day, which the Eighth Circuit granted on March 6, while also scheduling oral argument for May 12 alongside three other same-sex marriage cases.

Obergefell v. Hodges
Following the decision of the U.S. Supreme Court in Obergefell v. Hodges on June 26, 2015, Attorney General Peterson notified the Eighth Circuit that the state would no longer enforce its ban on marriage of same-sex couples. Same-sex couples began immediately marrying in Nebraska following the Supreme Court's ruling, with Kathy Pettersen and Beverly Reicks being the first same-sex couple to file marriage paperwork at the Douglas County Clerk's Office on June 26. Barbara DiBernard and Judith Gibson were the first to wed in Lancaster County, which contains the capital city of Lincoln. Susan and Sally Waters, plaintiffs in Waters, were issued a license on Friday, June 26 by the Douglas County Clerk, Tom Cavanaugh.

Governor Ricketts issued a statement critical of the ruling but said the state would comply, saying "We will follow the law and respect the ruling outlined by the court." Attorney General Peterson said the court had "overstepped its proper role in our system of government". State tax officials quickly issued guidance for married same-sex couples, and the Department of Motor Vehicles started processing name changes for driver's licenses based on marriage certificates for same-sex couples. Most Nebraska counties began immediately issuing marriage licenses to same-sex couples, or announced their willingness to do so. Officials in Buffalo, Dakota and Phelps counties initially reported they would not be issuing such licenses until they received further guidance from the state. However, both Governor Ricketts and Attorney General Peterson had announced by June 29, 2015 that the state would comply with the court's ruling and those counties promptly followed that guidance. The Sioux County Clerk, Michelle Zimmerman, was the only county clerk in Nebraska to expressly state she would not issue marriage licenses to same-sex couples, though the county's deputy clerk confirmed on July 11, 2015 that the office would process the marriage licenses of any same-sex couple who wishes to marry in the county.

On July 1, 2015, the Eighth Circuit lifted the stay it had imposed on Judge Bataillon's order, allowing his prohibition on the enforcement of Nebraska's denial of marriage rights to same-sex couples to take effect. On February 6, 2016, Judge Bataillon issued a permanent injunction striking down the state's defunct same-sex marriage ban. Though a formality, the injunction ordered state officials to treat same-sex couples the same as opposite-sex couples in everything from processing marriage certificates to issuing birth certificates, the latter something the state had previously attempted to ban same-sex couples from amending.

Native American nations
The Law and Order Code of the Ponca Tribe of Nebraska states that the code must "ensure that couples of the same sex and couples of opposite sex have equal access to marriage". The change was decided by the Tribal Council on a meeting on August 26, 2018. As of 2021, this wording has changed to "ensure that couples of the same sex and couples of opposite sex have equal access to marriage and to the protections, responsibilities, and benefits that result from marriage." They were believed to have been "instructed by the Moon", and would sometimes take men as partners.

During its monthly meeting in March 2022, two members of Tribal Council of the Winnebago Tribe of Nebraska proposed a motion to recognize same-sex marriages on the reservation. The motion was opposed by other council members who allegedly used homophobic language and called for LGBT people to be banned from the tribe. The motion to recognize same-sex marriages was voted down, with 4 of the 7 council members voting against. The Winnebago people have traditionally recognized two-spirit people who were born male but wore women's clothing and performed everyday household work and artistic handiwork which were regarded as belonging to the feminine sphere. They were believed to have been blessed by the spirit of the Moon, and were "holy and highly respected for special gifts such as prophesy, healing, artistry, and excelling at women's tasks". Many teją́čowįga married cisgender men, without indication of polygyny. Following the vote, Tyler LaMere, a 17-year-old two-spirit tribal member, released a video on TikTok, which was viewed more than a million times, calling on tribal leaders to reconsider their decision. The social media campaign led to the Tribal Council reconsidering the decision during its April 11 meeting. Council member Isaac Smith, who had voted to ban same-sex marriage back in March, introduced a motion to reconsider that vote. It passed 5–0 with two abstentions. The council then voted to add same-sex marriage to the tribal court code. "There was a real humbleness of the leadership to apologize to the relatives that they had offended.", said council member Victoria Kitcheyan.

Public opinion
{| class="wikitable"
|+style="font-size:100%" | Public opinion for same-sex marriage in Nebraska
|-
! style="width:190px;"| Poll source
! style="width:200px;"| Date(s)administered
! class=small | Samplesize
! Margin oferror
! style="width:100px;"| % support
! style="width:100px;"| % opposition
! style="width:40px;"| % no opinion
|-
| Public Religion Research Institute
| align=center| March 8–November 9, 2021
| align=center| ?
| align=center| ?
|  align=center| 58%
| align=center| 40%
| align=center| 2%
|-
| Public Religion Research Institute
| align=center| January 7–December 20, 2020
| align=center| 348 random telephoneinterviewees
| align=center| ?
|  align=center| 69%
| align=center| 31%
| align=center| <0.5%
|-
| Public Religion Research Institute
| align=center| April 5–December 23, 2017
| align=center| 519 random telephoneinterviewees
| align=center| ?
|  align=center| 54%
| align=center| 33%
| align=center| 13%
|-
| American Values Atlas/Public Religion Research Institute
| align=center| May 18, 2016–January 10, 2017
| align=center| 747 random telephoneinterviewees
| align=center| ?
|  align=center| 61%
| align=center| 27%
| align=center| 12%
|-
| American Values Atlas/Public Religion Research Institute
| align=center| April 29, 2015–January 7, 2016
| align=center| 587 random telephoneinterviewees
| align=center| ?
|  align=center| 49%
| align=center| 43%
| align=center| 8%
|-
| New York Times/CBS News/YouGov
| align=center| September 20–October 1, 2014
| align=center| 721 likely voters
| align=center| ± 3.9%
| align=center| 40%
|  align=center| 46%
| align=center| 14%
|-
| Public Policy Polling
| align=center| September 30–October 2, 2011
| align=center| 739 voters
| align=center| ± 3.6%
| align=center| 36%
|  align=center| 54%
| align=center| 10%
|-
| Greenberg Quinlan Rosner Research
| align=center| August 2–4, 2011
| align=center| 305 adults
| align=center| ± 4%
| align=center| 42%
|  align=center| 51%
| align=center| 12%
|-

See also
 LGBT rights in Nebraska
 Nebraska Initiative 416
 Same-sex marriage in the United States

References

External links
Waters v. Ricketts (Judgement of the United States District Court for the District of Nebraska, March 2, 2015)

Nebraska law
LGBT in Nebraska
Nebraska
2015 in LGBT history
2015 in Nebraska